Veganism involves following a vegan diet, which is a diet that includes no animal products of any kind. It can extend to ethical veganism which avoids or boycotts all products and activities whose production or undertaking is perceived to exploit animals, such as leather, silk, fur, wool, and cosmetics that have been tested on animals, as well as blood sports such as bullfighting and fox hunting.

All the people on this list are reportedly practising a vegan diet, or were at the time of their death.

List

See also 
 List of vegetarians
 List of fictional vegetarian characters
 List of pescetarians

References 

Vegans
Animal rights
Animal welfare
Cruelty to animals